Mehdi Hamama (born May 7, 1985) is an Algerian swimmer, who specialized in individual medley events. He represented his nation Algeria at the 2008 Summer Olympics, placing himself among the top 50 swimmers in the men's 200 m individual medley.

Hamama competed for Algeria in the men's 200 m individual medley at the 2008 Summer Olympics in Beijing. Two months before the Games, he eclipsed a FINA B-standard entry time of 2:05.54 at the Mare Nostrum Barcelona Meet in Spain. Rallying from fifth on the breaststroke leg in heat one, Hamama put up a tremendous effort to improve his lifetime best and smash a sub-2:05 barrier for the fourth spot in 2:04.91. Hamama failed to advance into the semifinals, as he placed forty-first overall in the prelims.

References

External links
NBC Olympics Profile

1985 births
Living people
Algerian male swimmers
Olympic swimmers of Algeria
Swimmers at the 2008 Summer Olympics
Male medley swimmers
Sportspeople from Algiers
21st-century Algerian people